Shane Johnson known as Shane Dollar, is a rapper who was born on June 30, 1980, in Suffolk, Virginia. He has performed with celebrity acts including Obie Trice, Cappadonna, Ghostface Killah, Raekwon, Nottz Raw, Cassidy, Bubba Sparxxx, Yelawolf, Nappy Roots, Ying Yang Twins, Mac Lethal, Ras Kass, Keith Murray, Nine, Canibus, Nature, Ces Cru, Lil Wyte, Kurupt and Rampage.

Dollar joined the Virginia-based hip hop collective Seven Cities Syndicate in June 2019.
Dollar released a seven-track LP in October 2019 with unreleased songs featuring Bubba Sparxxx, Nottz Raw, Bigg K (Battle Rapper), P.U.R.E. (Ice H2O Records with Raekwon and Rampage.  Shane Dollar was nominated for hip hop artist of the year in 2016, 2017 and 2018 by Veer Magazine, winning the award in 2018.

Albums
 P.R.O.J.E.C.T.S. (2003)
 Life, Love & Hip Hop (2012)
 The Underdog (2013)
 Work of Heart (2014)
 Legends (2015)
 Country Cousins (2015)
 Heart of Glass (2018)
 Legends Never Die Mixtape (2019)
 The Missing Records (2019)
 40 (2020)

References

https://altdaily.com/veteran-hampton-roads-dj-shane-dollar-returns-to-the-norva/
https://www.suffolknewsherald.com/2018/01/19/rapper-turned-dj-nominated-for-award/
https://www.suffolknewsherald.com/2018/02/19/suffolk-rapper-wins-big/

1980 births
Rappers from Virginia
Living people
21st-century American rappers